Karma is the third album by trombonist Robin Eubanks. It was recorded in 1991 and released on the JMT label.

Reception 
The AllMusic review by Scott Yanow said it was "quite a mixed bag".

Track listing
All compositions by Robin Eubanks except as indicated
 "Karma" - 7:38  
 "Mino" - 5:41  
 "Maybe Next Time" - 5:51  
 "Evidently" - 5:50  
 "Send One Your Love" (Stevie Wonder) - 4:05  
 "Never Give Up" - 5:00  
 "The Yearning" - 9:20  
 "Pentacourse" - 6:31  
 "Resolution of Love" - 6:53  
 "Remember When" - 5:42

Personnel 
 Robin Eubanks - trombone, percussion, chorus, rap, string samples
 Kimson "Kism" Albert - rap
Mino Cinelu - percussion, chorus
Kevin Eubanks - acoustic guitar, electric guitar, chorus
Earl Gardner - trumpet
Dave Holland - bass, chorus
Branford Marsalis - tenor saxophone
Greg Osby - alto saxophone
Lonnie Plaxico - electric bass
Renee Rosnes - piano, keyboards, chorus
Marvin "Smitty" Smith - drums, chorus, rap
Kenny Werner - keyboards
Cassandra Wilson - vocals

References 

1991 albums
Robin Eubanks albums
JMT Records albums
Winter & Winter Records albums